Catalina Londoño (born July 24, 1980 in Cartagena) is a Colombian actress. She is the niece of Florina Lemaitre, another Colombian actress.

Biography
Londoño was interested in acting since high school, where she participated in theater club. She moved to Bogotá in 1998 and started working in modeling. In 2004, she moved to Spain to study acting at Estudio Corazza. She relocated to Colombia again to play Mónica in the film Lecciones para un beso. She replaced actress Mabel Moreno in the television series Chepe Fortuna. She played the protagonist in the Colombian television series Casa de Reinas.

Filmography

Television
 Garzón vive, 2018
 Los hombres también lloran, 2015
 Chepe Fortuna, 2010
 La Dama de Troya, 2008

Cinema
 Loving Pablo, 2017
 Lecciones para un beso, 2011

References

External links
 

1980 births
21st-century Colombian actresses
People from Cartagena, Colombia
Living people